The Wales women's national under-16 basketball team is a national basketball team of Wales, administered by the Basketball Wales. It represents the country in women's international under-16 basketball competitions.

The team participated 8 times at the FIBA U16 Women's European Championship Division C. The best result is the fourth place in 2014, 2015 and 2017.

See also
Wales women's national basketball team
Wales women's national under-18 basketball team
Wales men's national under-16 basketball team

References

Basketball in Wales
Women's national under-16 basketball teams
Basketball